Alydinae is a subfamily of broad-headed bugs in the family Alydidae. There are about 24 genera and more than 140 described species in Alydinae.

Genera
These 24 genera belong to the subfamily Alydinae:

 Alydus Fabricius, 1803
 Apidaurus Stål, 1870
 Burtinus Stål, 1860
 Camptopus Amyot & Serville, 1843
 Daclera Signoret, 1863
 Euthetus Dallas, 1852
 Hamedius Stål, 1860
 Heegeria Reuter, 1881
 Hyalymenus Amyot & Serville, 1843
 Hypselopus Burmeister, 1835
 Megalotomus Fieber, 1860
 Melanacanthus Stål, 1873
 Mirperus Stål, 1860
 Nariscus Stål, 1866
 Nemausus Stål, 1866
 Neomegalotomus Schaffner & Schaefer, 1998
 Oxycranum Bergroth, 1910
 Riptortus Stål, 1860
 Robustocephalus Ahmad, Abbas, Shadab & Khan, 1979
 Stachyocnemus Stål, 1870
 Tenosius Stål, 1860
 Tollius Stål, 1870
 Tupalus Stål, 1860
 Zulubius Bergroth, 1894

References

 
Alydidae